Christmas Worship is the first Christmas album from Paul Baloche. Integrity Music released the album on October 28, 2013. Baloche released a follow-up to this album, Christmas Worship, Vol. 2 in 2015.

Critical reception

Awarding the album four stars at CCM Magazine, Grace Aspinwall states, "the heart of this album lies in its gorgeous arrangements." Lins Honeyman, giving the album a seven out of ten for Cross Rhythms, writes, "a varied release that pushes Christmas music forward whilst acknowledging the genre's glorious past." Reviewing the album from AllMusic, Thom Jurek says, "a collection of (mostly) traditional carols and hymns with worship choruses and cadenzas woven in for maximum effect."

Track listing

Personnel

Musicians 
 Paul Baloche – lead vocals, acoustic guitar 
 John Ardnt – keyboards, strings, string arrangements 
 Chris Springer – keyboards, organ
 Michael Marshall – acoustic piano 
 Ben Gowell – keyboards, programming, acoustic guitar, baritone guitar, mandolin
 Michael Rossback – keyboards, programming, electric guitars, mandolin, bass, percussion, glockenspiel, trumpet 
 Aaron Fabrinni – pedal steel guitar
 Carl Albrecht – drums, percussion 
 Daniel Grothe – drums, percussion
 David Baloche – trumpet, French horn
 Rita Baloche – backing vocals, vocal arrangements 
 Ben Clark – backing vocals 
 Joel Hebert – backing vocals 
 Jennifer Holm – backing vocals, lead vocals (11)
 Austin Johnson – backing vocals 
 Dani Rocca-Hebert – backing vocals 
 Brooke Wlliams – backing vocals, lead vocals (8)
 All Sons & Daughters – lead vocals (1)
 Trinity Christian Center Choir – choir (2, 5, 12)
 Kareem Riley – choir director (2, 5, 12)
 Onajé Jefferson – lead vocals (5)
 Kathryn Scott – lead vocals (6)
 Aaron Shust – lead vocals (7)

Production 
 C. Ryan Durham – executive producer
 Paul Baloche – producer 
 Ben Gowell – producer, engineer 
 Michael Rossback – producer, engineer  
 David Baloche – engineer 
 Gary Leach – engineer  
 F. Reid Shippen – mixing at Robot Lemon (Nashville, Tennessee)
 Paul "Paco" Cossette – mix assistant
 Andrew Mendelson – mastering at Georgetown Masters (Nashville, Tennessee)
 Becca Nicolson – production coordinator 
 Thom Hoyman – creative director, design

Chart performance

References

2013 Christmas albums
Christmas albums by American artists
Paul Baloche albums